Mercy is a 1995 independent thriller starring John Rubinstein, Amber Kain and Sam Rockwell, and written and directed by Richard Shepard. It was filmed in the boroughs of Manhattan and Queens, New York City.

Plot
Two people kidnap the daughter of a famous lawyer. They want money to give her back, but it's not just money they want. It's revenge.

Release 
Mercy premiered on February 22, 1995, after which it received a theatrical release in the United States during 1996.

Reception 
Critical reception has been mixed. The film received reviews from the Daily News and The Daily Times. Lawrence Van Gelder also reviewed Mercy for The New York Times, criticizing it for having a "monotonous focus on nasty people and ugly incidents".

References

External links 
 
Mercy (1995) at The New York Times website

1995 films
1995 crime thriller films
1995 independent films
1990s psychological thriller films
Films shot in New York City
1990s English-language films
American crime thriller films
American psychological thriller films
Films directed by Richard Shepard
1990s American films